Dhaka Medical College and Hospital (abbreviated DMCH) is a public medical college and hospital located in Dhaka, the capital city of Bangladesh. It houses medical school as well as a tertiary care hospital on one campus.

The country's first ever autologous bone marrow transplant took place in its bone marrow transplant unit.

History

Site during pre-college years
The college's original building was built before the Partition of Bengal of 1905. As of 1904, the building was being used as the secretariat (headquarters) of the newly formed provinces of East Bengal and Assam.

In 1921, it was turned over to the University of Dhaka, which was founded that year. A part of the huge building was used as the university's medical center, another part as the students' dormitory, and the rest as the office of the administrative wing of the Arts faculty.

In 1939, the Dhaka University council requested the British Government to establish a separate medical college in Dhaka. The proposal was postponed because of the onset of the Second World War.

During World War II the medical center building became an American armed forces hospital. The Americans vacated the building at the end of the war.

Establishment of the college
In 1946, due to the partition of India, all the advanced students (From K-4 to K-1) as well as many lecturers and professors were transferred from Calcutta Medical College to start academic studies and maintain hospital facilities in the newly established Dhaka Medical College. Academic classes started on 10 July, which is celebrated as DMC Day.

Major William John Virgin, the head of the committee formed to establish the Dhaka Medical College, was the first principal. In the beginning there were only four departments – medicine, surgery, gynecology and otolaryngology (ENT).

Since the college did not initially have anatomy or physiology departments, the students at first attended those classes at Mitford Medical School (now the Sir Salimullah Medical College); but, after a month, Professor of Anatomy Pashupati Basu and Professor of Physiology Hiralal Saha joined the staff and their specialties were taught in ward no. 22 of the hospital.

Expansion
There was no lecture hall nor dissection gallery at first. These needs were met after the construction of new academic buildings in 1955. The college did not have any student housing. Male students were allowed to reside in the Dhaka University's student halls, but female students did not have the use of that facility.

The college and hospital premises were expanded with temporary sheds, some of which were built for outdoor services of the hospital and some for student housing. New buildings for housing, college, and hospital were constructed in phases: a dormitory for girls in 1952, a dormitory for male students in 1954–55, a new complex of academic buildings in 1955, and a dormitory for internee doctors in 1974–75. A new academic and hospital building, adding 500 beds, Dhaka Medical College Hospital-2 (DMCH-2), was inaugurated by Prime Minister Sheikh Hasina on 3 October 2013.

Origin of 'K' 
Every student batch, or class, of Dhaka Medical College is tagged with the prefix K along with a number. The first year, the beginning batch of the college, was named K-1, likewise second year as K-2, third year as K-3, fourth year as K-4, and fifth year K-5. In 2021, DMC is hosting its 78th batch, hence branded as K-78. Many theories about the origin of the letter K exist, the most popular being that K stands for Kolkata, as many students of DMC's earlier batches migrated from Calcutta Medical College.

Though Kolkata was officially known as Calcutta until 2001 the city was widely pronounced as Kolkata/Kolikata in Bengali. Though the first ten medical schools didn't follow this tradition, yet another theory proposes that, as the institute was the 11th medical school in Indian subcontinent, K, the 11th letter of English alphabet, is used to represent that .

Fire in the new building 
On 19 January 2022, a fire was broke out in the 109 number cabin of the 10th floor of the new building of DMCH.

Undergraduate course
A countrywide combined medical admission test for MBBS course is held every year under the supervision of DGHS. Students after passing Higher Secondary School Certificate or equivalent examinations with the required grades can apply for the test. In 2020, 226 general seats and 4 seats for freedom fighter quota(Total 230) were allocated for MBBS course in Dhaka medical college.

The qualified candidates, according to their preferences, get the opportunity to study at Dhaka Medical College. Foreign candidates from both SAARC and non-SAARC countries are selected by DGHS and MOHFW as per required qualifications.

College runs 5-year MBBS course according to the curriculum developed by BMDC. A student studies Anatomy, Physiology, Biochemistry, Pathology, Pharmacology, Microbiology, Forensic Medicine, Community Medicine, Medicine & allied subjects, Surgery & allied subjects and Gynecology & Obstetrics during the course period.

The course is divided into 4 phases. Four professional examinations, one at the end of each phase, are held under University of Dhaka. After passing the fourth or final professional examination, a student is awarded with MBBS degree. Course curriculum follows percentage system grading. Pass mark for the college's internal as well as professional examinations is 60 percent. Student shall have to pass written (MCQ + SAQ + formative), oral, practical and clinical examinations separately. Students scoring 85 percent or above in a subject are awarded with honors.

Postgraduate courses 
College offers MD, MS, Diploma, Mphil in 43 different subjects in affiliation with University of Dhaka and Bangabandhu Sheikh Mujib Medical University.

College also runs three fellowship courses of Bangladesh College of Physicians and Surgeons in different disciplines.

Principals

Hospital wing

Facilities and services 
Dhaka Medical College has a 2600-bed teaching hospital as Dhaka Medical College Hospital (DMCH) within the same compound. It is a tertiary referral hospital. It has a 300-bed facility dedicated for burn & plastic surgery. It was the largest burn unit of the country until Sheikh Hasina National Institute of Burn and Plastic Surgery was set. In 2015, Hospital's Out-Patient Department provided services to 799,896 patients. More 346,580 patients attended at the emergency and 149,122 patients got admitted in different facilities of the hospital in 2015. The surgical staffs performed 58,355 surgeries in 2015. Expansion plan to turn the hospital into a 5000-bed facility has been contemplated.

Country's first bone marrow transplant center was set in this hospital in October 2013 in collaboration with Massachusetts General Hospital. This unit conducted first ever successful autologous bone marrow transplant in the country in March 2014. The unit also introduced allogeneic bone marrow transplant on 3 July 2019, the first in the country.

Clinical teaching 
It is one of the major teaching hospitals in the country. Bedside teaching and clinical examinations of the undergraduate as well as postgraduate students take place at the hospital wing.

Dhaka Medical College Hospital is a recognized clinical examination centre for fellowship examination of Bangladesh College of Physicians and Surgeons.

Hospital administration  
Director of the hospital is the administrative chief of the hospital service. Deputy director, assistant directors and other officials give him assistance in this regard. Faculties from different departments of the college act as clinical and administrative superiors of the respective department. They actively supervise the clinical services as well as clinical training of the trainee doctors.

Student life

Students' accommodation 

In the past, Ramesh Chandra Majumdar, the then vice chancellor of University of Dhaka, arranged accommodation for the medical college students. Muslim students were accommodated in Salimullah Muslim Hall, Hindus were accommodated in the then Dhaka Hall (now Dr. Muhammad Shahidullah Hall). Baptist mission hostel at Sadarghat accommodated the Christian students. Nursing Hostel was allocated for the female students. Later, 20 medical barracks were built and students were accommodated there. As of 2019, there are four hostels for accommodation of the students as well as interns.

 Shaheed Dr. Fazle Rabbee Hall (established in 1955) - For male students (named after martyred intellectual Mohammed Fazle Rabbee)
 Dr. Alim Chowdhury Hall - For female students (named after martyred intellectual AFM Alim Chowdhury)
 Shaheed Dr. Shamsul Alam Khan Milon Intern Doctors' hostel (Male) (named after the martyred activist of anti-autocracy movement in 1990, Shamsul Alam Khan Milon)
 Shaheed Dr. Shamsul Alam Khan Milon Intern Doctors' Hostel (Female)

Dr. Fazle Rabbee Hall and Dr. Milon Intern Doctors' hostel (for male) share the same compound at Bakshibazar, Lalbagh, Dhaka. Dr. Alim Chowdhury hall and Dr. Milon Intern doctors' hostel (for female) share the same compound inside the territory of the college.

Club Activities 
There are several clubs are active in the Campus. The most important are-Sandhani (Sandhani Dhaka Medical College Unit), Medicine Club, Sporting Club, Debating Club, Quizzing Society,Career Club, Cultural Society, Student Welfare Club, Rotaract Club.

Sports facility 
DMC has a sports ground inside Fazle Rabbee Hall. It is used for football, cricket, and other athletics. Fazle Rabbee Hall also houses a basketball ground and a tennis ground. Besides, college building and hostels have students' common rooms with indoor game facility

Cultural activities 
College has an auditorium with 1200 sitting capacity. DMC day is celebrated each year on 10 July, the foundation day of the college.

Role in national politics

Bengali Language Movement (1948-1952)
The college dormitories that were known as barracks were at the heart of the Bengali Language Movement from 1948 to 1952. The barracks were formerly situated at the current location of the Shaheed Minar.

There were about 20 tin shed barracks where the medical students resided. Because they were close to the Parliament of East Pakistan (presently Jagannath Hall of Dhaka University), the medical dormitories were chosen as the center of the student movement.

In the early hours of 21 February 1952, all the students of Dhaka Medical College gathered in front of the medical college dormitories. In the afternoon the group headed for the parliament which was in session. No procession was allowed due to the imposition of Section 144 (a section of the penal code that prohibited unlawful assembly). The students decided to defy Section 144 at 4:00 PM at the historic Aam-tola (which was situated beside the present day Emergency gate).

The police fired at the procession, resulting in the deaths of Salam, Barkat, Rafique, Jabbar and Shafiur.
After sunset on 21 February, at the site of the deaths, the students of Dhaka Medical College decided to build a monument. Badrul Alam and Sayed Haider the then students of Dhaka Medical College planned and designed the structure. They worked continuously on 22 and 23 February and finished the construction, using bricks, gravel and cement reserved for the hospital. A paper with Shaheed Smritistambha( Monument in memory of the martyrs) written on it was attached on the monument. It was inaugurated by the father of Shofiur Rahman, a martyr of language movement. However, the monument was demolished by government forces on 26 February 1952.

Liberation War (1971)
Many staff and students took part in the 1971 Bangladesh Liberation War, as fighters or in treating the injured. DMC's doctors, teachers and students laid their lives in the war. Many eminent physicians and academics were abducted from home and killed during the war.

Notable people

Alumni 
 Sitara Begum, doctor, army officer awarded the Bir Protik
 Mohammed Fazle Rabbee, cardiologist, intellectual killed during the Bangladesh Liberation War
 AFM Alim Chowdhury, ophthalmologist, intellectual killed during the Bangladesh Liberation War
 A. Q. M. Badruddoza Chowdhury, Former President of Bangladesh, Independence Day Award awardee in 1993
 Sayed Haider, activist in the Bengali language movement, designer of Shaheed Minar, Ekushey Padak awardee (2016)
 Golam Moula, activist in the Bengali language movement, Eksushey Padak awardee (2010) (posthumous)
 Badrul Alam, activist in the Bengali language movement, designer of first Shaheed Minar, Ekushey Padak awardee (2014)
 Ahmed Rafiq, activist in the Bengali language movement, writer, researcher, Ekushey Padak awardee (1995)
 Mirza Mazharul Islam, surgeon, language movement veteran, Ekushey Padak awardee (2018)
 Abdul Malik, cardiologist, National Professor award winner, founder of National Heart Foundation, and National Institute of Cardiovascular Diseases, awardee of Independence day award (2004)
 Shahla Khatun, National Professor award winner, obstetrician/gynecologist 
 Dipu Moni, Education Minister, former Minister of Foreign Affairs
 A F M Ruhul Haque, former Health and Family Welfare Minister, orthopedic surgeon, former President of Swadhinata Chikitshak Parishad
 Syed Modasser Ali, former health advisor to Prime Minister Sheikh Hasina
Shamsul Alam Khan Milon, activist killed during the 1990 Mass Uprising in Bangladesh
 Abul Kalam Azad, Director General of Directorate General of Health Services
Rashiduddin Ahmad, neurosurgeon, awardee of Independence Day Award in 1999 and Bangladesh National Sports Award in 2007, first captain of East Pakistan National Basketball team and Captain of Bangladesh team in Davis Cup 1989
 Lutfor Rahman, cardiac surgeon
 AKM Fazlul Haque, pioneer colorectal surgeon
 Quazi Deen Mohammad, neurologist, Founding Director of NINS, President of Bangladesh College of Physicians and Surgeons
 Meerjady Sabrina Flora, epidemiologist, former Director of IEDCR
 Mostofa Jalal Mohiuddin, President of Bangladesh Medical Association, formerly President of Bangladesh Chhatra league
 M Iqbal Arslan, President of Swadhinata Chikitshak Parishad
 Kanak Kanti Barua, neurosurgeon, Vice-chancellor of BSMMU
 AHM Touhidul Anowar Chowdhury, obstetrician/gynecologist, awardee of Independence Day Award in 2017
 A K M Ahsan Ali, Pulmonologist, pioneer of the DOTS method of treating tuberculosis, awardee of Independence Day Award in 2018

See also
 List of medical colleges in Bangladesh

References

External links
 Official website

Medical colleges in Bangladesh
Universities and colleges in Dhaka
Hospitals in Dhaka
Educational institutions established in 1946
Hospitals established in 1946
1946 establishments in India
Medical education in Bangladesh